Hiloula of Rabbi Haïm Pinto is the Yom Hillula, or anniversary of the death of Rabbi Haïm Pinto. It is one of the most popular Hiloulas in North Africa. It is celebrated in Essaouira, Morocco.

Every year, more than 2000 Jewish pilgrims visit the city for a four-days celebration to commemorate the memory of the Rabbi.

History 
Rabbi Haïm Pinto (1743–1845) was the chief rabbi of the city of Essaouira, and part of a distinguished rabbinic family.  After his death on 26 Elul of the year 5605 of the Hebrew calendar, his mausoleum, as well as his house became places of pilgrimage and Jews from all over the world come to pray in the family synagogue, and at his grave in the old Jewish cemetery of the city.

See also
 Chaim Pinto
 Chaim Pinto Synagogue

References 

Essaouira
Jews and Judaism in Morocco
Moroccan-Jewish diaspora
Jewish pilgrimage sites
Jewish pilgrimages